e-Dyario was the first Spanish digital newspaper based in the Philippines established in Manila on 2010 and made by Filipino journalists. e-Dyario was part of the international cooperation project of Ventura de los Reyes. An initiative supported by the Government of Spain through the Spanish Agency for International Cooperation for Development (AECID) and developed by Kapatiran Sandugo Foundation, with the support and assistance of the Association Press of Cadiz. Its aim was to promote the use of Spanish language and the traits of the Spanish-Filipino culture all over the country. It also has an article section written in Chavacano language.

See also
History of the Philippines (1521-1898)
Filipinas, Ahora Mismo
Spanish influence on Filipino culture
Spanish language in the Philippines

External links
AECID

Spanish-language newspapers
Asian news websites
Newspapers published in Metro Manila